This is a list of films produced, co-produced, and/or distributed by Warner Bros. for the years 1980–1989.

See also 
 List of New Line Cinema films
 List of films based on DC Comics
 List of Warner Bros. theatrical animated feature films
 :Category:Lists of films by studio

References 

Lists of Warner Bros. films
Warner Bros. films
Warner Bros